John Thomas Brown (2 April 1935 – 9 April 2000) was a Scottish footballer, who played for Hibernian, Third Lanark, Tranmere and Hartlepools United.

References

External links 
John Thomas Brown, FitbaStats

1935 births
2000 deaths
Footballers from Edinburgh
Association football fullbacks
Scottish footballers
Hibernian F.C. players
Third Lanark A.C. players
Tranmere Rovers F.C. players
Hartlepool United F.C. players
Scarborough F.C. players
Scottish Football League players
English Football League players